François Duhourcau (25 February 1883 – 3 March 1951, Bayonne), graduated from the École spéciale militaire de Saint-Cyr in the infantry in 1905, was a 20th-century French novelist, essayist and historian, winner of the Grand prix du roman de l'Académie française in 1925.

Works

References

External links 
 François DUHOURCAU on the site of the Académie française

École Spéciale Militaire de Saint-Cyr alumni
20th-century French writers
French biographers
French Roman Catholic writers
20th-century French historians
Grand Prix du roman de l'Académie française winners
People from Bayonne
1883 births
1951 deaths